The 2018–19 Gibraltar Premier Division was the 120th season of the top-tier state football league in Gibraltar, as well as the sixth season since the Gibraltar Football Association joined UEFA in 2013. The league was contested by ten clubs, and began on 13 August 2018.

Lincoln Red Imps were the reigning champions, having won their 23rd title the previous season. They competed in the UEFA Champions League qualifiers, while Europa and St Joseph's contested the UEFA Europa League qualifiers. The season was marred by revelations of betting rules violations by a host of players and coaches at a number of clubs.

Format
The ten Premier Division clubs played each other three times for a total of 27 matches each. The tenth-placed team in the league would be relegated and the ninth-placed team in the league would enter a playoff with the second-placed team from the Second Division for a place in the 2019–20 Premier Division.

The champions earned a place in the preliminary round of the 2019–20 Champions League, and the second–placed club earned a place in the preliminary round of the 2019–20 Europa League. This season also saw the expansion of the Home Grown Player Rule to require all teams to have a minimum of three Gibraltarian players on the field of play at all times, as well as introducing a maximum registered squad size of 25 players. However, the introduction of the Gibraltar Intermediate League allows them to register a reserve squad of 18 players, of which 13 must be Gibraltarian.

Violations of betting rules
Starting in November, the Gibraltar FA began issuing a number of bans following an in-depth investigation of suspected betting rule violations by players and coaches. At first, several Europa players, including Rubo Blanco, Iván Moya and manager Juan José Gallardo, were banned Following this, Lincoln Red Imps manager Yiyi Pérez was also suspended In March 2019, Lions Gibraltar and Gibraltar Phoenix players including Rafael Bado and Juan Manuel Llaves received bans. On 12 April, 4 further players from Boca Gibraltar, Gibraltar United and Manchester 62, as well as former St Joseph's and Glacis United manager Alfonso Cortijo, received bans.

Teams

At the conclusion of the previous season, Manchester 62 were relegated. Boca Gibraltar took their place, having won the Second Division title and earning promotion for the first time in their history.

Lynx finished 9th the previous season, leaving them to face the runners up in the Second Division, FC Olympique 13, in a play-off. Lynx won the play-off 2–0 on 8 June 2018 to secure their status in the Premier Division.

Note: Flags indicate national team as has been defined under FIFA eligibility rules. Players may hold more than one non-FIFA nationality.

Ñito Jiménez replaced Blas Álvarez as Gibraltar Phoenix captain after the latter was banned by the GFA for the remainder of the season, while Alberto Caravaca replaced Kalian Perez as Lions Gibraltar captain after Perez was banned for 16 months.

Managerial changes

League table

Results

Matches 1–18

Matches 19–27

Season statistics

Scoring

Top scorers

Hat-tricks

Clean Sheets

Awards

Monthly awards 
No league football was played in September 2018 due to the international break and the Gibraltar Music Festival.

End-of-season awards
End of season awards were handed out by Football Gibraltar, the Gibraltar Football Association's official UEFA correspondents, on 28 May and 2 June.

See also
2018–19 Gibraltar Second Division
2018–19 Gibraltar Intermediate League

References

External links
soccerway
Gibraltar Football Association

Gibraltar Premier Division seasons
Gib
1